Dudley George Little (1914 – 1972) was a business owner and political figure in British Columbia. He represented Skeena in the Legislative Assembly of British Columbia from 1960 to 1972 as a Social Credit member.

He was born on June 9, 1914 in Terrace, British Columbia, the son of George Little and Clara Beate, and was educated there. In 1938, Little married Mary Catherine Welch. He served on the municipal council for Terrace. Little was a building supply company owner. He died on October 14, 1972.

The Little Canyon was named after him.

References 

1914 births
1972 deaths
British Columbia Social Credit Party MLAs
People from Terrace, British Columbia